Şeyhmus Dağtekin (born in 1964) is a Kurdish poet and writer. Dağtekin was born in the village of Olgunlar in Adıyaman Province in Turkey. He currently resides in France, Paris, where has lived since 1987. He writes in Turkish, Kurdish or French, and is the author of seven poetry books, and a novel À la source, la nuit. He has played a leading role in renewing French poetry.

Awards
Şeyhmus Dağtekin has received prizes in France: The Mallarmé Poetry Prize 2007 and The Théophile Gautier Poetry Prize of The Académie française 2008 for his book Juste un pont sans feu, The Yvan Goll International Francophone Poetry Prize for Les chemins du nocturne and the special mention of The Five Continents of the Francophonie Prize in 2004 for his novel.

Works
Sortir de l'abîme, manifeste, Le Castor astral (2018)
A l'ouest des ombres, Le Castor astral (2016)
Élégies pour ma mère, Le Castor astral (2013)
To the Spring, by Night, MQUP (2013)
Ma maison de guerre, Le Castor astral (2011)
Au fond de ma barque, L'Idée bleue (2008)
Juste un pont sans feu, Le Castor astral (2007) 
La langue mordue, Le Castor astral - Écrits des Forges (2005)
À la source, la nuit, Robert Laffont (2004)
Couleurs démêlées du ciel, Le Castor Astral - Écrits des Forges (2003)
Le verbe temps, Le Castor Astral - Écrits des Forges (2001)
Les chemins du nocturne, Le Castor Astral (2000)
Artères-solaires, L'Harmattan (1997)
Aşkın Yalın Hali, Ünlem Yayınları, 1992

References

External links 
 Şeyhmus Dağtekin Website  
 MQUP's page: 
 Review Quill and Quire: 
 Review Montreal Review of Books:  
 On Nomadics 
 The Publisher Castor Astral Website  
 Printemps des Poètes Website 

]
1964 births
Living people
People from Olgunlar, Adıyaman
Kurdish poets
Turkish poets
French male poets
Turkish Kurdish people
French people of Kurdish descent
Turkish emigrants to France
Kurdish culture in France